Petukhovo is a rural locality (a village) in Pelymskoye Rural Settlement, Kochyovsky District, Perm Krai, Russia. The population was 89 as of 2010. There are 4 streets.

Geography 
Petukhovo is located 11 km north of Kochyovo (the district's administrative centre) by road. Kuzmino is the nearest rural locality.

References 

Rural localities in Kochyovsky District